The 1985 Three Days of De Panne was the 9th edition of the Three Days of De Panne cycle race and was held on 26 March to 28 March 1985. The race started in Tielen and finished in De Panne. The race was won by Jean-Luc Vandenbroucke.

General classification

References

Three Days of Bruges–De Panne
1985 in Belgian sport